This is a list of shipwrecks located in or around the continent of Asia.

Arabia

Bahrain

Qatar

Saudi Arabia

United Arab Emirates

Yemen

Bangladesh

Brunei

Myanmar (Burma)

China

East Timor

Hong Kong

India

Indonesia

Japan

Lebanon

Malaysia

Nine historic trade ships carrying ceramics dating back to the 10th century until the 19th century were excavated under Swedish engineer Sten Sjöstrand in the South China Sea. 

 Royal Nanhai (circa 1460), found in 1995

 Nanyang (circa 1380), found in 1995

 Xuande (circa 1540), found in 1995

 Longquan (circa 1400), found in 1996

 Turiang (circa 1370), found in 1996

 Singtai (circa 1550), found in 1998

 Desaru (circa 1830), found in 2001

 Tanjong Simpang (AD 960- 1127), found in 2001

 Wanli (early 17th century), found in 2003

Philippines

Russia

Singapore

South Korea

Sri Lanka

Taiwan

Thailand

Turkey

Vietnam

References

External links
 WRECKSITE Worldwide free database of + 65,000 wrecks with history, maritime charts and GPS positions
  The Southeast Asian Ceramic Society's helpful list of shipwrecks carrying Southeast Asian or Chinese ceramics with summaries of the wrecks and their contents

Asia
Shipwrecks